Michael Alban Farmer (September 27, 1901 – December 27, 1988) was a Canadian politician, who served in the Legislative Assembly of Prince Edward Island from 1959 to 1970. A member of the Prince Edward Island Progressive Conservative Party, he represented the electoral district of 5th Queens from 1959 to 1966, and 6th Queens from 1966 to 1970, and served on the Executive Council of Prince Edward Island as provincial treasurer and attorney general in the government of Walter Shaw.

Born and raised in Kinkora, Prince Edward Island, Farmer was educated at Prince of Wales College, St. Dunstan's University and Dalhousie University. Prior to his election to the provincial legislature, he worked as a lawyer and as private secretary to provincial Lieutenant Governor George de Blois, served on Charlottetown City Council from 1946 to 1952 and mounted two unsuccessful campaigns for mayor of Charlottetown.

References

1901 births
1988 deaths
Progressive Conservative Party of Prince Edward Island MLAs
Members of the Executive Council of Prince Edward Island
Charlottetown city councillors
Lawyers in Prince Edward Island
People from Kinkora, Prince Edward Island